The Pointe de la Plaine Morte is a mountain of the Bernese Alps, located on the border between the Swiss cantons of Bern and Valais. It overlooks the large and flat glacier named Plaine Morte Glacier, from the south-west side.

The Pointe de la Plaine Morte is part of the Crans-Montana ski area and can be easily accessed by a cable car via Les Violettes. Only a short walk is necessary to reach the summit.

On the summit, there is a radar installation that has been operated by MeteoSwiss since 2014.

Gallery

See also
List of mountains of Switzerland accessible by public transport

References

External links
 Pointe de la Plaine Morte on Hikr

Mountains of the Alps
Mountains of Valais
Mountains of the canton of Bern
Bern–Valais border
Mountains of Switzerland
Two-thousanders of Switzerland